Kara Murat Pasha, or Kara Dev Murat Pasha, lit. Courageous Giant Murat Pasha in Ottoman Turkish; (1595 - 1655), was an Ottoman Albanian statesman and military officer. He served as Kapudan Pasha and twice as Grand Vizier. His epithet Kara ("black") refers to his courage and Dev ("giant") to his physical size.

Early years 
Murat was of Albanian origin. He distinguished himself in the early phases of Cretan War between the Ottoman Empire and the Republic of Venice. He was assigned to various posts in the Janissary corps (the professional regiments that formed the core of the Ottoman army), and in 1648, during the enthronement of Mehmed IV, he was promoted to be commander of the Janissary corps. When the Ottoman Navy was defeated by the Venetians in the Battle of Focchies on 12 May 1649, the Grand Vizier Sofu Mehmed Pasha was blamed for the defeat, and he was replaced by Kara Murat Pasha on 21 May. Murat had Sofu Mehmed Pasha exiled and then executed.

First term as Grand Vizier 
At the time of Murat's appointment as Grand Vizier, the sultan was only seven years old and the two Valide sultans (his mother Turhan Hatice and grandmother Kösem), who were acting as regents, were locked in a power struggle. While Kösem supported Murat, Turhan Hatice was against him. Moreover, the leaders of the Janissaries, Murat's former colleagues, were also against him. Feeling that his life was in danger, Murat resigned on 5 August 1650. Upon his suggestion, he was succeeded by Melek Ahmed Pasha.

After his resignation, Murat was appointed as the governor of Budin (modern Budapest, Hungary). In 1653, he returned to Istanbul and was appointed Kapudan Pasha (grand admiral) and tasked with transporting reinforcements and ammunition to Crete by sea. The Venetian navy was blockading the Dardanelles Strait at the time, but Murat managed to defeat the Venetians and break their blockade in the First Battle of the Dardanelles.

Second term as Grand Vizier and death 
Murat Pasha was reappointed as the Grand Vizier on 11 May 1655. His second term was very short; due to economic problems as well as opposition from the Janissaries, he had to resign on 19 August 1655. He was then appointed to the governorship of the Damascus Eyalet in Syria, but along the way to take up the post, he fell ill and died. In the five years between his two terms as Grand Vizier, six different pashas were appointed to the office, an indication of the political instability of the empire in the mid-17th century.

See also
 List of Ottoman Grand Viziers
 List of Ottoman governors of Damascus

References

17th-century Ottoman military personnel
1655 deaths
17th-century Grand Viziers of the Ottoman Empire
Pashas
Albanian Grand Viziers of the Ottoman Empire
Kapudan Pashas
Year of birth unknown
Ottoman governors of Damascus
Ottoman people of the Ottoman–Venetian Wars
Cretan War (1645–1669)